Veer Shivaji (English: Brave Shiva) is an Indian historical drama series that aired on Colors TV. The show focuses on the life of Chhatrapati Shivaji Maharaj, the 17th century founder of the Maratha Empire. It premiered on 2 September 2011 and was produced by Contiloe Telefilms, who had earlier created the historical drama Jhansi Ki Rani on Zee TV. Due to the instant success and popularity and with TRP of more than 2.60, the show timing were extended to five days a week (Monday to Friday at 8:30 pm) from 3 October 2011.

After the introduction of adult Chhatrapati Shivaji Maharaj (from Paras Arora to Amol Kolhe), the drama's target rating points began to dip drastically. The show abruptly ended on 25 May 2012.

Cast

Paras Arora as Chhatrapati Shivaji Raje Bhosle  - Jijabai and Shahaji Bhosle's son , Sambhaji Bhosle's brother and Saibai and Soyarabai Bhosle's husband and become first Maratha King .
Amol Kolhe as Chhatrapati Shivaji Raje Bhosle 
Shilpa Tulaskar as Jijabai Bhosale - Shahaji's first wife, Sambhaji and Shivaji Maharaj's mother.
Palak Jain as Saibai Bhosle (née Sai Nimbalkar) - Shivaji Maharaj's first and beloved wife, Mother of Sambhaji, Daughter of Mudhoji Rao and sister of Bajaji Rao. 
Sonia Sharma as Elder Sai Bhonsale
 Ayesha Kaduskar as Soyarabai Bhosle - (née Soyara Mohite) Shivaji Maharaj's second wife and Rajaram and Balibai 's mother.
 Ruchita Jadhav as Elder Soyarabai Bhosle
Milind Gunaji as Shahaji Raje Bhosale - Jijabai's husband, Shivaji and Sambhaji's father
Mandar Jadhav as Sambhaji Raje Bhosale - Shivaji's elder brother
Smita Shewale as Putalabai Bhosle- third wife of Shivaji Maharaj
Hemant Choudhary as Shyamraj Nilkant Pant- Prime Minister in Shivaji Maharaj's Darbar
 Ritesh Mobh  as Elder Sambhaji Raje Bhosle
 Ali Hassan as Muhammad Adil Shah
 Natasha Sinha as Begum Huzur - Sultan Adil Shah's mother 
Amit Behl as Sonopant Pingle
 Kumar Hegde as Baji Pasalkar
 Alok Narula as Rustam Zaman
Chetan Hansraj as Inayat Khan
Behzaad Khan as Noor Khan
Nawab Shah as Afzal Khan
Sonia Singh as Rambha Naikin / Janabai - A famous dancer and courtesan.
 Manoj Kumar as Aurangzeb
Aarav Chowdhary as Dara Shikoh
 Amit Mohanrao Deshmukh as Bhimaji "Bhimya" Wagh
Jasveer Kaur as Gauhar - Inayat Khan's mistress
Dinesh Sharma as Tanaji Malusare
Ravi Bhatia as Jiva Mahala
 Ishita Vyas as Janakibai
 Romanch Mehta as Jaswant Singh
 Yuri Suri as Sujat Khan
Manoj Verma as Fateh Khan
Amit Pachori as Netaji Palkar
Gopal K Singh as Bahirji Naik
Raza Murad as Shah Jahan
 Sonia Sharma as Elder Saibai Bhosle
Devdatta Nage as Tanaji Malusare
 Zaffar Beg  as Sharhaan Singh
Rishabh Jain  as Raghoji
 Brownie Parasher as Krishnaji Bhatt
 Mahendra Ghule as Sayyad Banda
Ahmad Harhash as Yuvraj Malhotra

References 

2011 Indian television series debuts
Indian television soap operas
Colors TV original programming
2012 Indian television series endings
Indian period television series
Shivaji
Indian historical television series
Television series set in the 17th century
Cultural depictions of Shivaji